Manoj Prabhakar  (born 15 April 1963) is a former Indian cricketer and Coach, who recently coached Nepal National Cricket Team. He was a right-arm medium-pace bowler and a lower-order batsman, and has also opened the innings sometimes for the Indian cricket team until his retirement in 1996.

Prabhakar took 96 wickets in Test cricket, 157 wickets in One Day Internationals, and over 385 first class wickets playing for Delhi. He has also played for Durham. Prabhakar would always be remembered for his bowling which was his strongest suit; using slower balls, out swingers and opening the bowling for Indian cricket team. He was also a useful lower-order batsman and a defensive opener. Manoj Prabhakar is having a world record of playing most matches as Opening Batsman cum Opening Bowler in both Test and ODI Matches.

Career

As a Player
Prabhakar quite regularly opened Indian batting order and the bowling, he was one of the few players to do so consistently at international level. He accomplished this 45 times in ODIs and 20 times in Tests, more than any other player in both formats.

At the age of 32, Prabhakar played his last ODI against Sri Lanka in the 1996 Cricket World Cup in Delhi. He struggled to bowl well in the match and had to bowl off-spin in the last two overs. The crowd booed him off the ground. After 1996 World Cup, he was not selected for the Indian team's tour of England and took the retirement.

As a Coach
Prabhakar has also served as the Delhi cricket team's bowling coach and as the head coach of the Rajasthan cricket team. In November 2011, he was sacked as the coach of Delhi for speaking against the management and the team in media. In December 2015, he was named as bowling coach of Afghanistan cricket team ahead of 2016 ICC World Twenty20 that was played in India in March 2016.

Prabhakar was appointed head coach of Nepal in August 2022. He resigned in December 2022 after only four months.

Controversies
In 1999, Prabhakar participated in an expose of match-fixing by the Tehelka news organisation. However, he was then charged by the BCCI with involvement in match fixing and subsequently banned from playing cricket for the Indian team.

In 2011, he was dismissed from his coaching role with the Delhi cricket team after he publicly criticized the players and selectors.

Personal life 
Prabhakar joined the Congress party and unsuccessfully contested election to the Indian Parliament from Delhi in 1996. Prabhakar is married to actress Farheen, who is known for her roles in the films Jaan Tere Naam and Kalaignan. The couple lives in Delhi, with their two sons, Raahil Prabhakar and Manavansh Prabhakar, and also Rohan Prabhakar, a son from previous marriage with Sandhya.

In popular culture
A Bollywood film Azhar released in 2016, directed by Tony D'Souza, was based on his teammate Mohammad Azharuddin life and revolves around Match fixing scandals in late 90s and 2000. Prabhakar's character was portrayed by Karanvir Sharma in the film. According to the report of The Times of India, Prabhakar was unhappy due to his depiction in bad light in the film.

See also 
List of cricketers banned for match fixing

References

External links 

 : Article about Prabhakar's Hundred

India One Day International cricketers
India Test cricketers
Indian cricketers
Delhi cricketers
Durham cricketers
North Zone cricketers
1963 births
Living people
Cricketers from Ghaziabad, Uttar Pradesh
Recipients of the Arjuna Award
Indian cricket coaches
Cricketers at the 1987 Cricket World Cup
Cricketers at the 1992 Cricket World Cup
Cricketers at the 1996 Cricket World Cup
Indian cricket commentators
All India Indira Congress (Tiwari) politicians
Indian National Congress politicians
Cricketers banned for corruption
Coaches of the Nepal national cricket team
Sportspeople involved in betting scandals